Kinomap is a complete end-to-end platform for creating, hosting, sharing and using motion videos for user-generated videos. Kinomap allows uploading motion videos shot with a GPS camera or a common camera coupled with GPS track from another device (such as a smartwatch). Kinomap platform contains geolocated video shooting (2D, 3D, terrestrial and aero), applications for Smartphone and tablets, data acquisition and integration, dedicated web portals and features like round-tour management, audio and video navigation, video tourism, indoor fitness training etc.

The maps combine the video with navigation routes, and add physical data (like altitude, elevation, speed, pollution level, three-dimensional acceleration, bearing/direction, radioactivity, temperature and distance covered figures). During playback, a user may fast-forward the video to any desired point through video, map or graph. Navigation maps can be viewed in any one of several map formats including Google Map, Satellite, Terrain, Earth and OpenStreetMap (O.S.M.). A user may tag his Point of Interests on the map, identified during the journey, set Hot Spots, add notes or comments and specify a travel mode (pedestrian, car, bus, train, aircraft etc.).

History
Kinomap has been developed by ExcelLance SARL, a software company from Douai, France founded in 2002, which specialises in Mobile Applications development, consulting, engineering, systems integration and outsourcing services in different sectors such as telecoms, bank and insurance, energy, transport, public authorities and administrations, industry, publishers, content editors and distributors. Till 31 July 2017, Kinomap has hosted more than 100 000 Kilometers covered in more than 10,000 user generated geolocation videos from the Kinomap Contributors of 30 different nationalities, visitors from 85 different countries and hosts geolocated videos majorly related to fitness training, adventure sports and travel videos.

Motion videos
A motion video is a video with GPS features. It is achieved by synchronising user generated videos with the data related to the location and the navigation path of the user (.GPX, .FIT files), highlighted on the maps, so that the viewer gets more information apart from the video feed. A geolocation video may be used in several ways such as for grouping geographically similar videos or geotagged relevant videos, geotagging of videos by the user or the viewer, augmented reality during video chat, creating maps of nearby friends during video chat, 3-dimensional realisation of triangular disaster or crisis spots using multiple video feeds, video-check-in feature,
 video tourism, health and fitness apps feed, GPRS navigation etc.

== Features and components ==
Kinomap website was created for the purpose of hosting motion videos and organising the Kinomap Community consisting of Kinomap Contributors and Kinomap Users. High Definition videos are supported and are available in the Kinomap video store. Neither the type of video format nor the resolution quality of the video and nor the video upload limit is restricted for a Kinomap Contributor.
A Kinomap Contributor is a free user who uploads his geolocation videos on the official website of Kinomap. The Kinomap platform consists of the Kinomap Website (www.kinomap.com), the Kinomap Community, and a pool of application software.

Kinomap applications :
 Kinomap Fitness.
 Kinomap Trainer.
 BEONTRACK.
 SKUGA.
 INTERVALS.
 BULLTRAINER.
Equipment-dedicated apps :
 Kettmaps.
 BH by Kinomap.
 B'TWIN TRAINING

Partnerships and awards
Kinomap has partnerships with Pôle Régional Numérique, Nord-Pas-De-Calais Region

and is one of the supporters of Bik'Earth project

.

Kinomap won the ANT+ Innovator Prize, the "Orange Innovation Prize" and is a member of the Ant+ Alliance. Also, the application Kinomap Trainer has won awards like Macworld Editor's Choice

, Cycling Plus magazine App of the Month

etc. and has featured in a number of magazines like Apps Magazine

, Mobile Choice
 etc.

See also
 Geolocation
 User generated content

Notes

References

 List of Kinomap videos referenced on Wikipedia

Android (operating system) software
IOS software
Windows Phone software
Bada software
Video on demand services
Video hosting
Information technology companies of France
Companies based in Hauts-de-France